Asian music encompasses numerous musical styles originating in many Asian countries.

Musical traditions in Asia

 Music of Central Asia
 Music of Afghanistan (when included in the definition of Central Asia)
 Music of Kazakhstan
 Music of Kyrgyzstan
 Music of Mongolia (culturally Central Asia)
 Music of Tajikistan
 Music of Turkmenistan
 Music of Uzbekistan
 Music of East Asia
 Music of Taiwan
 Music of China
 Music of Hong Kong
 Music of Japan
 Music of Korea
 Music of North Korea
 Music of South Korea
 Music of Tibet
 Music of South Asia
 Asian Underground
 Music of Afghanistan
 Music of Bangladesh
 Music of Bhutan
 Music of India
 Ravanahatha
 Music of the Maldives
 Music of Nepal
 Music of Pakistan
 Music of Sri Lanka
Music of Southeast Asia
Music of Brunei
Music of Cambodia
Music of East Timor
Music of Indonesia
Music of Sunda
Music of Java
Music of Bali
Music of Laos
Music of Malaysia
Music of Myanmar
Music of the Philippines
Music of Singapore
Music of Thailand
Music of Vietnam
 Music of West Asia (Middle East)
 Arabic music
 Music of Bahrain
 Music of Jordan
 Music of Iraq
 Music of Lebanon
 Music of Palestine
 Music of Saudi Arabia
 Music of Syria
 Music of the United Arab Emirates
 Music of Yemen
 Music of Armenia
 Assyrian/Syriac folk music
 Music of Azerbaijan
 Music of Cyprus
 Music of Georgia
 Music of Iran
 Diaspora Jewish music
 Music of Turkey

See also 

 List of cultural and regional genres of music
 Byzantine music
 Music of: Africa, Europe, Latin America, North America, and Oceania

 01
Arts in Asia